Lithomyrtus retusa is a member of the family Myrtaceae endemic to Western Australia.

It blooms between January to December producing white-pink flowers.

It is found in gullies, escarpments and streambanks in the Kimberley region of Western Australia  where it grows in skeletal soils over sandstone.

References

Myrtaceae
Flora of Western Australia
Plants described in 1999